Hassan Khamisi Ramadhani, known as Hassan Kessy (born 25 December 1994) is a Tanzanian football player. He plays in Zambia for Nkana.

International
He made his Tanzania national football team debut on 28 November 2015 in a 2015 CECAFA Cup game against Ethiopia.

He was selected for the 2019 Africa Cup of Nations squad.

References

External links
 
 

1994 births
People from Morogoro Region
Living people
Tanzanian footballers
Tanzania international footballers
Association football defenders
Mtibwa Sugar F.C. players
Simba S.C. players
Young Africans S.C. players
Nkana F.C. players
Tanzanian expatriate footballers
Expatriate footballers in Zambia
2019 Africa Cup of Nations players
Tanzanian Premier League players